The 2016 Monza GP3 Series round was a GP3 Series motor race held on 3 and 4 September 2016 at the Autodromo Nazionale Monza in Italy. It was the seventh round of the 2016 GP3 Series. The race weekend supported the 2016 Italian Grand Prix.

Background
Ralph Boschung would return to the category after sitting out the previous round in Belgium due to financial difficulties. As well as this, Óscar Tunjo would not return to the category for this round after making his return in Belgium.

Classification

Qualifying
Charles Leclerc took his third pole of the year and ART Grand Prix's sixth straight of the year, followed by the Arden International duo of Jake Dennis and Jack Aitken.

Notes

1. – Janosz was issued a three-place grid penalty after causing a collision with Arjun Maini. Seeing as how he could not serve his penalty in full, he started the feature race from the pitlane.

Race 1
It was a British lockout with Jake Dennis taking the victory, Jack Aitken achieving second and Jake Hughes third, as well as the fastest lap of the race.

Race 2
Nyck de Vries took his first GP3 victory to put ART Grand Prix beyond reach in the GP3 Teams Championship. Team-mate Albon took second place whilst Antonio Fuoco achieved third in his home race.

Standings after the round

Drivers' Championship standings

Teams' Championship standings

 Note: Only the top five positions are included for both sets of standings.

See also 
 2016 Italian Grand Prix
 2016 Monza GP2 Series round

References

External links 
 Official website of GP3 Series

|- style="text-align:center"
|width="35%"|Previous race:
|width="30%"|GP3 Series2016 season
|width="40%"|Next race:

GP3
GP3
Monza